Valery Chkalov (UK title - The Red Flyer, United States title - Wings of Victory) is a Soviet biopic about the life of Valery Chkalov, directed by Mikhail Kalatozov. The screenplay was written by Georgy Baidukov, Boris Chirskov and Dmitri Tarasov. The film was produced by Lenfilm and distributed in the United States by Artkino Pictures (1941), and later by Top1Video (1999).

Cast
 Vladimir Belokurov as Valery Chkalov
 Mikheil Gelovani as Joseph Stalin
 Semyon Mezhinsky as Sergo Ordzhonikidze
 Kseniya Tarasova as Olga Chkalova
 Vasili Vanin as Pasha Palic
 Serafima Birman
 Pyotr Berezov as Georgiy Baidukov
 Boris Zhukovsky as Cmdr. Alyoshin
 Fyodor Bogdanov as Grandfather
 Irina Zarubina
 Sergei Yarov as Alexander Belyakov
 I. Smyslovsky
 Mikhail Kalatozov
 Boris Andreyev
 Arkady Raikin as American journalist

References

External links

1941 films
1940s biographical drama films
Soviet biographical drama films
Russian biographical drama films
Soviet black-and-white films
Lenfilm films
Films directed by Mikhail Kalatozov
Russian aviation films
1940s Russian-language films
1941 drama films
Russian black-and-white films
Biographical films about aviators